Chilakapachcha Kaapuram is a 1995 Indian Telugu-language drama film, produced by C. Surendra Raju under the Divya Art Pictures banner, directed by Kodi Ramakrishna. It stars Jagapathi Babu, Meena and Soundarya, with music composed by Vidyasagar. The film is a remake of the Tamil movie Kizhakku Vasal (1990). The film was recorded as a Hit at the box office. Despite being remade from Tamil film, this Telugu remake was dubbed in Tamil as Thedi Vandha Devathai.

Plot
The film begins in a village adjacent to the river Godavari. It is enforced by Parasuramaiah & Bullabbai the brothers-in-law and antagonists. Gopala Krishna is a beloved person of the village, whose livelihood is rowing a boat and he also seeks to end the brothers-in-law's conflict. Satyavati, the daughter of Parasuramaiah silently endear Gopala Krishna. Once, Bullabbai gets a girl Radha from the city and she is cloistered. Moreover, she is restricted to meet anyone. So, Gopala Krishna cleverly enters the premises, befriends her, and slowly love blossoms between them. Meanwhile, Gopala Krishna's mother Ramulamma is aware of Satyavathi's love and proceeds with a marriage proposal when she is mortified by Parasuramaiah. As a result, she commits suicide. Here, enraged Gopala Krishna onslaughts on Parasuramaiah on the verge to slay him, he backs on the request of his wife. Now Parasuramaiah mingles with Bullabbai for vengeance. So, they stabs Gopala Krishna immediately Radha admits him in hospital and rescues him. Then, he solicits Radha about her past. Radha is a simple family girl when her mother is terminally ill, Bullabbai exploited and fetched her. But she keeps dodging him and keeps herself chaste. Hearing it, Gopala Krishna decides to marry Radha. Forthwith, Parasuramaiah reforms through his wife and accepts Satyavati's love. On their return, Bullabai storms on Gopala Krishna & Radha, but the villagers cease him. Finally, the movie ends on a happy note with the union of Gopala Krishna & Radha and Satyavati sacrificing her love.

Cast
Jagapathi Babu as Gopala Krishna 
Meena as Radha 
Soundarya as Satyavathi 
Charan Raj as Bullabbai
Giri Babu
Costumes Krishna
Mukka Narasimha Rao as Parasuramaiah
Annapurna as parasuramaiah's wife
Silk Smitha as item number
Subha as Ramulamma
Dubbing Janaki as bullabbai's wife

Soundtrack

Music composed by Vidyasagar. Music released on Supreme Music Company.

Other
 VCDs and DVDs on - SHALIMAR Video Company, Hyderabad

References

1995 films
1990s Telugu-language films
Indian romantic drama films
1995 romantic drama films
Films directed by Kodi Ramakrishna
Films scored by Vidyasagar
Telugu remakes of Tamil films